Eddie Chin (born Yung Fook Chin, November 3, 1948, in Singapore) is a Malaysian musician who was formerly bassist with the British rock and pop band The Tourists.

As part of his early career, Chin joined the skiffle group, the Pigsty Hill Light Orchestra along with fellow musician Robert Greenfield.

In 1976 Chin was introduced to Annie Lennox and Dave Stewart and The Tourists were formed.

After the Tourists disbanded in late 1980, Coombes and Chin began a new project named Acid Drops but this met with little success.

References

Singaporean musicians
American people of Singaporean descent
1948 births
Living people
American rock bass guitarists
The Tourists members
American expatriates in England